The Cherokee Tribe of Northeast Alabama (CTNEAL), formerly the Cherokees of Jackson County, is a state-recognized tribe in Alabama. They have about 3,000 members. The tribe has a representative on the Alabama Indian Affairs Commission and the Inter-Tribal Council of Alabama. They are not federally recognized as a Native American tribe.

Organization 
CTNEAL has more than 3,000 members, most living within the state of Alabama. The state-recognized tribe has a constitution that governs the leadership government and members. It elects a Principal Chief, two Vice Chiefs as well as a tribal Council. Elections are held every four years.

The tribes history predates 1980.

CTNEAL members identify as being of Cherokee descent. As members of a state-recognized tribe, CTNEAL individuals are eligible to participate in organizations such as the National Congress of American Indians. They can market their arts and crafts as being Native American or American Indian–made under the 1990 Indian Arts and Crafts Act but they are not eligible for federal benefits.

The Eastern Band of Cherokee Indians and Cherokee Nation have listed the Cherokee Tribe of Northeast Alabama as a fraudulent group.

Nonprofit 
In 1980, the Cherokees of Jackson County Cherokee Tribe of Northeast Alabama formed a 501(c)(3) nonprofit organization.

Edna Fowler, based in Boaz, Alabama, was the registered agent as of 2018.
The nonprofit legally changed names in 1983 and 1997.

Name 
The tribe was formally known as Cherokees of Jackson County. Under the leadership of Dr. Lindy Martin, the group changed its name. As the tribe grew in membership, it changed its name to the Cherokee Tribe of Northeast Alabama to reflect a larger geographic area.

Petition for federal recognition 
The Cherokee Tribe of Northeast Alabama sent a letter of intent to petition for federal recognition in 1981. However, the tribe has not proceeded  with submitting a completed petition for federal recognition.

Activities 
The tribe and 501c3 are involved with many events and services not limited to the following; community, school, art, demonstrations, health information and Native American activities. Events and activities are held in and out of the state.

Membership criteria
The Cherokee Tribe of Northeast Alabama requires all potential members to have verifiable Cherokee descent. The rolls are open to any person who can document Cherokee ancestry. It does not require a minimum blood quantum.

In addition to verifiable, lineal descent from a Cherokee ancestor(s), CTNEAL also has a residency requirement for membership. CTNEAL requires that potential members meet at least one of three requirements; 
Reside within the state of Alabama
Reside within a 500-miles radius of Pinson, Alabama
Descend from an enrolled CTNEAL member who lives/lived within Alabama or the residency radius.

Issues
Cherokee Tribe of Northeast Alabama struggles with trying to help their members. Many who live below the poverty line and have inadequate housing, medical needs, and high school dropout rates. Other issues include everyday needs such as food, water, heat, cooling, electricity, transportation, rent assistance, and much more.

See also
 Alabama Indian Affairs Commission
 Cherokee heritage groups
 Native American identity in the United States
 National Congress of American Indians

External links

References 

1980 establishments in Alabama
Cherokee heritage groups
Cultural organizations based in Alabama
Native American tribes in Alabama
Non-profit organizations based in Alabama
State-recognized tribes in the United States